Arnetta is a genus of grass skippers in the family Hesperiidae.

Species
Arnetta atkinsoni (Moore, 1878)
Arnetta mercara (Evans, 1932)
Arnetta verones (Hewitson, 1878)
Arnetta vindhiana (Moore, 1884)

References

External links
Natural History Museum Lepidoptera genus database

 
Butterflies of Indochina
Hesperiidae genera